The John Fiechter House, also known as Failing Cottage, is a historic house in Benton County, Oregon, United States.

It is believed to be the oldest house in Benton County. It is included in the William L. Finley National Wildlife Refuge.

The house was listed on the National Register of Historic Places in 1985.

See also
National Register of Historic Places listings in Benton County, Oregon

References

External links

1857 establishments in Oregon Territory
Greek Revival houses in Oregon
Houses completed in 1857
Houses in Corvallis, Oregon
Houses on the National Register of Historic Places in Oregon
National Register of Historic Places in Benton County, Oregon